The Serenity Role Playing Game is a science fiction role-playing game released in 2005 and set in the universe of the movie Serenity. It was produced by Margaret Weis Productions, Ltd, and its mechanics were the first iteration of the Cortex System.  It won an Origins Award for best RPG in 2005 and Margaret Weis' license came to an end on January 31, 2011.

In February 2013, Margaret Weis Productions announced they now had a license to produce a game based on the Firefly TV series, this time with the rights to the characters who appeared in the series rather than those who appeared in the film.  At Gencon 2013, a preview of the system entitled Gamin' In The Verse was offered for sale both at GenCon and for a limited time as a PDF. In 2014, the Firefly Role-Playing Game was released, followed by four game supplements in 2014 and 2015.

Contents

The book is in full color and also includes biographies of the characters, in the words of Mal, and statistics of the crew. Each chapter opens with a narrative to give the mood and feeling of the setting. These narratives alternate between a crew created by MWP and the crew of 'Serenity'. There are many photographs used as illustration throughout the book, but all are sampled from the film Serenity as opposed to the show Firefly. This is due to MWP acquiring their rights from Universal Studios rather than 20th Century Fox. For this reason, as well, the previously mentioned narrative text may come close to something that happened in an episode of Firefly but will diverge in some way to stay within the license purchased through Universal.

The first chapter introduces the character and setting, giving a brief history of The Verse and the basic concepts of play. The next few chapters deal with character creation as well as details on Attributes, Skills, and Traits. Following the character creation chapters are chapters on more detailed play systems, additional setting information, equipment, and running the game, including profiles for many pre-generated non-player characters, a sample crew other than the crew of 'Serenity', several sample ships, and stats for some of the secondary cast of the film. At the end of the book there is an appendix which goes over Chinese as it is used in the setting and a short primer for those who want to insert it into their games.

Related products

 Out in the Black by Laura and Tracy Hickman, the system's first adventure, was released on 2006-03-15.

Margaret Weis Productions, Ltd has also released a gamemaster's screen as well as specialty d2 die for sale on their website.

Two more books were released for the Serenity RPG in 2008, with a third in 2009, and the first installment of the Echoes of War series for the Firefly RPG was also released under the rules for the Serenity RPG.
 Serenity Adventures, a collection of short adventures and winner of the 2008 Origins Award.
 Six Shooters and Spaceships, a ship and technology sourcebook
 Big Damn Heroes Handbook, a rule expansion that won the 2009 Origins Award for Best Supplement
 The Wedding Planners Cortex Classic Set, a part of the Echoes of War series for the Firefly RPG released using the rules for the Serenity RPG

In the run-up to the release of the Firefly Role-Playing Game, MWP produced an Echoes of War series of adventures:
 Gaming in the 'Verse (preview released at GenCon 2013)
 Echoes of War: The Serenity Crew (contains stats for the various members of the Serenity and quickstart rules)
 Echoes of War: The Wedding Planners
 Echoes of War: Shooting Fish
 Echoes of War: Friends in Low Places

System

The Serenity Role Playing Game was the first game to be produced under the Cortex System.  It is a rules light generic roll-over system using polyhedral dice.   Each of a character's attributes and skills is assigned one of these dice types, with larger dice representing greater ability, ranging from d4 to d12+d4.  When a character attempts an action, such as piloting a spacecraft, shooting a gun, or punching someone, the player rolls the die for the character's applicable attribute and the die for their appropriate skill, adds the results together, and compares the total against a difficulty number based on the difficulty of the task being attempted

The Firefly Role-Playing Game was produced under the Cortex Plus system, and the dice pool includes three basic sections; an attribute (Physical/Mental/Social, either one at d6, one at d8, and one at d10 or all three at d8), a skill, and a distinction chosen from a list that may be rolled at d8 or rolled at d4 to gain a plot point.  Each distinction comes with two possible traits, and starting characters pick two out of the possible six.  Further there may be an asset used (signature assets start at d8) or a complication on the other party.  Take the two highest for task resolution.

Reception
Serenity won the 2005 Origins Award for the Gamer’s Choice Best Role Playing Game of the Year.

Serenity won the 2006 Gold Ennie Award for "Best Production Values".

Reviews
Pyramid

References

ENnies winners
Firefly (franchise) games
Margaret Weis Productions games
Multigenre Western role-playing games
Origins Award winners
Role-playing games based on films
Role-playing games introduced in 2005
Space opera role-playing games